Ajdin Pašović (born 1 January 1957) is a Yugoslav alpine skier. He competed in three events at the 1976 Winter Olympics, where he ranked 46th in downhill skiing.

References

External links
 

1957 births
Living people
Yugoslav male alpine skiers
Olympic alpine skiers of Yugoslavia
Alpine skiers at the 1976 Winter Olympics
Place of birth missing (living people)